Gornji Štrbci is a village in Croatia.

Population

According to the 2011 census, Gornji Štrbci had 18 inhabitants.

Note: Till 1931 name of the settlement was Štrbci, in 1948 Lički Štrbci and from 1953 it is now named Gornji Štrbci. From  1857-1880 data is include in the settlements of Kruge and Nebljusi, and in 1890 part of data is include in the settlement of Nebljusi.

1991 census 

According to the 1991 census, settlement of Gornji Štrbci had 59 inhabitants, which were ethnically declared as this:

Austro-hungarian 1910 census 

According to the 1910 census, settlement of Gornji Štrbci had 215 inhabitants in 3 hamlets, which were linguistically and religiously declared as this:

Literature 

  Savezni zavod za statistiku i evidenciju FNRJ i SFRJ, popis stanovništva 1948, 1953, 1961, 1971, 1981. i 1991. godine.
 Knjiga: "Narodnosni i vjerski sastav stanovništva Hrvatske, 1880-1991: po naseljima, autor: Jakov Gelo, izdavač: Državni zavod za statistiku Republike Hrvatske, 1998., ;

References

Populated places in Lika-Senj County